INS Khukri was a Type 14 (Blackwood-class)  frigate of the Indian Navy.  She was sunk off the coast of Diu, Gujarat, India by the Pakistan Navy  submarine  on 9 December 1971 during the Indo-Pakistani War of 1971.  This was the first warship sunk in action by a submarine since World War II. It remains the post-Independence Indian navy's only warship to be lost in war.

Sinking
The 14th Frigate Squadron of the Western Fleet was dispatched to destroy the submarine. It normally consisted of five ships, Khukri, Kalveti, Krishna and Kuthar, but at the time of the incident Kuthars boiler room was being repaired in Bombay. One reason that may have prompted the decision to deploy two obsolete Blackwood-class frigates against a modern Daphne-class submarine was that the Indian Navy lacked sufficient numbers of anti-submarine aircraft.

The submarine sighted the squadron on the evening of 9 December.  Khukri was still not aware of the submarine's presence and continued slowly on a steady course because she was testing an improved version of the 170/174 sonar, which required a low speed to increase detection, despite the fact that moving on low speed was against Indian anti-submarine doctrine. At 19:57 Hangor fired a homing torpedo on a sonar approach at Kirpan. The torpedo did not explode and was detected by Kirpan which turned away and fired anti-submarine mortars.  Khukri increased its speed and turned towards the submarine, which then fired a second torpedo directed at Khukri. The torpedo struck Khukri and exploded under its oil tanks.  According to the Pakistani submarine captain, Commander Ahmed Tasnim, the ship sank within two minutes. Other sources claim that Khukri was struck by three torpedoes before going down.

After a few minutes, Kirpan attacked Hangor with depth charges, as her anti-submarine mortars were no long functional. Hangor then fired a final torpedo at Kirpan before leaving the area.  Hangor patrolled the region for the next four days before returning safely to her berth.

Casualties
Khukri is the only ship lost in combat in the history of the Indian Navy. Eighteen officers and 176 other sailors were killed. The captain, Mahendra Nath Mulla, was among the casualties and is the only Indian captain to go down with a vessel as INS Khukri is the only warship of Indian navy lost in combat. He was posthumously awarded India's second-highest military honour, the Maha Vir Chakra.

There is a memorial to the sailors in Diu. The memorial consists of a scale model of Khukri encased in a glass house, placed atop a hillock facing the sea. The memorial was inaugurated by Vice Admiral Madhvendra Singh as the flag officer commanding-in-chief.

Controversy
Responsibility for errors by Indian naval officers related to the sinking has caused some controversy.  The naval officer who led the inquiry into the sinking, Benoy Bhushan, has claimed that India's official naval history invented fictional accounts to cover up bungling and a surviving sailor from the frigate, Chanchal Singh Gill, has called for an investigation and withdrawal of gallantry awards to negligent officers in the squadron.

See also

 Indo-Pakistani War of 1971
 Timeline of the Bangladesh Liberation War
 Military plans of the Bangladesh Liberation War
 Mitro Bahini order of battle
 Pakistan Army order of battle, December 1971
 Evolution of Pakistan Eastern Command plan
 1971 Bangladesh genocide
 Operation Searchlight
 Indo-Pakistani wars and conflicts
 Military history of India
 List of military disasters
 List of wars involving India

Notes

References

External links
 Bharat Rakshak's article on the incident

Blackwood-class frigates of the Indian Navy
Indo-Pakistani War of 1971
Shipwrecks in the Arabian Sea
Ships sunk by submarines of Pakistan
Maritime incidents in 1971
1956 ships
Diu, India
Frigates of the Cold War